Dundubia spiculata is a species of cicadas (Hemiptera: Cicadidae) in the tribe Dundubiini.  The recorded distribution includes Indo-China and Peninsular Malaysia.

Description
Describing Dundubia spiculata from Cambodian specimens, Noualhier stated that they are "Completely similar in shape, size and colour to D. mannifera Lin. [ambiguous synonym of Dundubia vaginata (Fabricius, 1787)], but distinct in shape of its metasternal opercula which are drawn back to a point or instead of being rounded; they are moreover widened after the basal constriction, which distinguishes it from D. intemerata Walk. [synonym of Dundubia rufivena Walker, F., 1850] in which these opercula are regularly attenuated by this constriction at the end."

References

External links
 Picture on cicadamania.com: Dundubia spiculata Noualhier, 1896 (retrieved 3 April 2019)

Hemiptera of Asia
Dundubiini